The Electoral district of Maldon was an electoral district of the Victorian Legislative Assembly.

Maldon was created in the expansion of the Assembly in 1859 by the Victorian Electoral Act, 1858. Its area was defined by the Act:
 also known as Bet Bet Creek.

It was abolished by the post-Federation Electoral Districts Boundaries Act 1903 which took effect in 1904.

Members of Maldon

See also
 Parliaments of the Australian states and territories
 List of members of the Victorian Legislative Assembly

References

Former electoral districts of Victoria (Australia)
1859 establishments in Australia
1904 disestablishments in Australia